Meludia is a French-based company that offers an online interactive education platform to master the fundamentals of music.
The Meludia Method is based upon progressive interactive listening exercises, using two main frameworks designed by Vincent Chaintrier.

The SEMA model represents the 4 levels of music perception: Sensations, Emotions, Memory, Analysis. 
The 7 dimensions of music represent: rhythm, spatialization, dynamic, form, timbre, melody and harmony.

History
Bastien Sannac and Vincent Chaintrier co-founded Meludia in June 2012. Meludia was further developed in the Cent Quatre, a public cultural incubator in Paris, before being commercially launched in 2014. Meludia is used at The Curtis Institute of Music in Philadelphia. Meludia has also been deployed to entire populations by several countries, like Estonia, Malta, Canada. and the Faroe Islands.

Awards
Gold Medal and Grand Prix award at the 2014 Concours Lépine for Innovation.
Gold Medal and Grand Prix award at the 2014 European Concours Lépine for Innovation.
Grand Prix for cultural innovation at Fabfest Paris 2014.
Le Web 2013 - Semi-finalist.
South by Southwest - SXSW Festival Finalists in 2015 SXSW Interactive Innovation Awards  in Austin, Texas in 2015.

See also
 Learning music by ear
 Ear training
 Absolute pitch
 Relative pitch
 Audiation
 Tonal memory
 Musical aptitude
 Music education for young children
 Music theory
 Solfège
 List of music software

References

External links
 Official Meludia website
 Meludia review from the Uberchord blog
 Meludia review from Music Teachers Helper blog

French educational websites
Music technology
Musical training software
Ear training